Chittagong General Hospital (aka Chittagong 250 bed General Hospital),() is a public hospital in Chittagong, Bangladesh. It has two hundred and fifty bed facility. It has been an affiliated hospital of Chittagong Medical College since 1959.

History
General Hospital was mainly established as a dispensary in 1840, and after developed into a hospital on the Rangmahal Hill in Andarkilla, Chittagong. The Rangmahal hill was historically renowned as the part of the Arakani Fort, which was burnt and ravaged by the action of the Mughal Navy in 1666.

Gallery

References

External links

1840 establishments in Asia
Hospital buildings completed in 1840
Hospitals in Chittagong